Andrianovo is the name of several rural localities in Russia.

Modern localities
Andrianovo, Arkhangelsk Oblast, a village in Voznesensky Selsoviet of Primorsky District in Arkhangelsk Oblast
Andrianovo, Kostroma Oblast, a village in Belkovskoye Settlement of Vokhomsky District in Kostroma Oblast; 
Andrianovo, Leningrad Oblast, a village under the administrative jurisdiction of Tosnenskoye Settlement Municipal Formation in Tosnensky District of Leningrad Oblast; 
Andrianovo, Nizhny Novgorod Oblast, a village in Krasnogorsky Selsoviet under the administrative jurisdiction of the town of oblast significance of Shakhunya in Nizhny Novgorod Oblast; 
Andrianovo, Kalininsky District, Tver Oblast, a village in Chernogubovskoye Rural Settlement of Kalininsky District in Tver Oblast
Andrianovo, Kalyazinsky District, Tver Oblast, a village in Semendyayevskoye Rural Settlement of Kalyazinsky District in Tver Oblast
Andrianovo, Torzhoksky District, Tver Oblast, a village in Klokovskoye Rural Settlement of Torzhoksky District in Tver Oblast
Andrianovo, Zapadnodvinsky District, Tver Oblast, a village in Zapadnodvinskoye Rural Settlement of Zapadnodvinsky District in Tver Oblast
Andrianovo, Yaroslavl Oblast, a selo in Andrianovsky Rural Okrug of Pereslavsky District in Yaroslavl Oblast

Alternative names
Andrianovo, alternative name of Andriankovo, a village under the administrative jurisdiction of the Town of Klin in Klinsky District of Moscow Oblast;

See also
Andrianov